Cameron Wilson (born November 2, 1992) is an American professional golfer who has played on the Web.com Tour, PGA Tour Latinoamérica, and PGA Tour Canada. He qualified for the 2018 U.S. Open and finished in 64th place with a final score of 301 which was 21-over-par.

Amateur wins
this list may be incomplete
2009 Metropolitan Amateur
2013 Ike Championship
2014 NCAA Division I Championship

Results in major championships

CUT = missed the half-way cut
"T" = tied

References

External links
 
 

American male golfers
Stanford Cardinal men's golfers
PGA Tour Latinoamérica golfers
Golfers from Connecticut
Sportspeople from Stamford, Connecticut
Sportspeople from Norwalk, Connecticut
1992 births
Living people